The Soulution is an EP collaboration between hip hop group Epidemic and hip hop producer Tantu,

it was originally started as a guest feature for Tantu's release "Language of beats" but became a project in it own right. The entire EP is produced by Tantu and equates to 25 minutes of overall play. Fashawn and Johaz of Dag Savage are both featured once on separate tracks.

Track listing

References

2014 albums